Frank Augustus Hinkey (December 23, 1870 – December 30, 1925) was an American college football player and coach.  He was notable for being one of only three college football players in history to be named a four-time consensus All-American.  He was elected to the College Football Hall of Fame in 1951.

Early years
Born in Tonawanda, New York, he attended DeVeaux College and Phillips Andover.

Yale University

While attending Yale University, he played for the Yale Bulldogs football team for four years, was captain his junior and senior years, and each year was named to the College Football All-America Team. One writer claims "when all-time ends are named, Hinkey invariably heads the list." He graduated from Yale University in 1895 and was a member of Psi Upsilon and Skull and Bones.

Business career
He ran several businesses, including zinc smelting plants in Kansas and Illinois, and worked with fellow Yale teammate and All-American Frank Butterworth at a brokerage.  He was head coach of the Yale team from 1914 to 1915. During those two seasons, he had an 11–7 record.

Referee
According to Dr. Harry March's, often inaccurate book Pro Football: Its Ups and Downs, Hinkey was a referee at the 1903 World Series of Football held at Madison Square Garden. March states that the officials during the series "were dressed in full evening dress, from top hats down to white gloves and patent leather shoes." During the last play of the series in a game between the Franklin Athletic Club and the Watertown Red & Black, the Franklin players, knew that they had the game in hand. As a result, the Franklin backfield agreed to purposely run over the clean and sharply dressed Hinkey in jest, knocking him into the dirt. Hinkey took the incident in good-nature and Franklin's management agreed to pay his cleaning bill.

Death
Hinkey died from complications of tuberculosis on December 30, 1925. He was 55 years old.

Head coaching record

References

Additional sources

External links
 
 

1870 births
1925 deaths
19th-century players of American football
American football ends
American football officials
Yale Bulldogs football coaches
Yale Bulldogs football players
All-American college football players
College Football Hall of Fame inductees
People from Tonawanda, New York
Players of American football from New York (state)
20th-century deaths from tuberculosis
Tuberculosis deaths in North Carolina